Alejandro López de Haro Ramirez (January 8, 1949 – May 24, 2010) was a Venezuelan photographer, writer and stockbroker. He held a Bachelor of Science in business from Bryant College and an MBA in Finance from New York University.

After founding and managing Bancalf, an investment bank and brokerage house, in Caracas, Venezuela for twenty years López de Haro eventually sold his company and retired to Paris, France and Madrid, Spain. Here he dedicated most of his time to photography and writing. His writings have been published in Analitica Venezuela and the topics usually had to do with the arts and politics. In 1997, he was admitted into the British Institute of Professional Photography until he decided to dedicate himself to art photography rather than more commercial photography. López de Haro worked mostly with platinum prints. In November 2005 his first book of photographs and poems Los Crepúsculos de la Imaginación was published by Lodima Press. Notable buyers of the book have included the Maison Européenne de la Photographie and Karl Lagerfeld's art bookshop Librairie 7L in Paris.

Los Crepúsculos de la Imaginación was included in the list of 100 best photography books by PHOTOESPAÑA 2008. López de Haro's photographs were exhibited at the National Library of Spain. His photographs have been exhibited in Paris, Los Angeles and Madrid.

His second book, Apuntes de la India,  a collection of photographs and essays was published in February 2014 by delCentro Editores in Madrid, Spain.

His father was Venezuelan businessman Antonio López Fajardo.

References

External links
 Interview with Alejandro López de Haro (in Spanish)
 "Los Crepúsculos de la Imaginación" Booktease
 Lodima Press feature on Los Crepúsculos de la Imaginación
 Librería del Centro feature on "Apuntes de la India"
 Analitica Venezuela has López de Haro's articles in its archives
 Alejandro López de Haro's blog
 Website

1949 births
People from Caracas
Venezuelan photographers
Venezuelan male poets
2010 deaths
21st-century Venezuelan poets
21st-century male writers